CMLL Super Viernes is professional wrestling promotion Consejo Mundial de Lucha Libre's (CMLL) Friday night wrestling show that takes place in Arena México. The show is held every Friday night unless a Pay-Per-View or a supercard wrestling event is scheduled to take place on that night. CMLL began holding their weekly Friday night "Super Viernes" shows as far back as 1938 and continue the tradition through 2020 as well. Some of the matches from Super Viernes were taped for CMLL's weekly shows that air in Mexico and the United States on various channels in the weeks following the Super Viernes show. The Super Viernes events featured a number of professional wrestling matches, in which some wrestlers were involved in pre-existing scripted feuds or storylines and others were teamed up with no backstory reason as such. Wrestlers themselves portrayed either "Rudos" or fan favorites ("Tecnicos" in Mexico) as they competed in matches with pre-determined outcomes.

The March 20 show was cancelled due to the COVID-19 pandemic, with the possibility that further Friday night shows would be cancelled for the same reason. It was originally scheduled to be CMLL's annual Homenaje a Dos Leyendas show. Super Viernes also hosted most of the major CMLL annual tournaments, which in 2020 so far has included the Torneo Nacional de Parejas Increíbles and the Mexican National Tag Team Championship tournament.

Super Viernes shows of 2020

Footnotes

References

2020 in professional wrestling
Professional wrestling-related lists
2020